Elisha Kirk House is a historic home located at Calvert, Cecil County, Maryland, United States. It is a two-story, Federal-style brick house built about 1813, five bays wide and two deep, with a new stone wing. The house features a one-story, flat-roofed portico with four Doric columns.

During the period of 1867 through the mid-1880s, Mary E. Ireland and her family lived at the Elisha Kirk House.

The Elisha Kirk House was listed on the National Register of Historic Places in 1982.

References

External links
, including photo from 1981, Maryland Historical Trust

Houses on the National Register of Historic Places in Maryland
Houses in Cecil County, Maryland
Federal architecture in Maryland
Houses completed in 1813
National Register of Historic Places in Cecil County, Maryland